

BUGS 2

Komachi is one of the three Japanese members of the BUGS 2 expedition sent to Mars and one of the only two who survived. Despite disliking conflict, has a strong sense of justice. When he was 15 years old, he saw his childhood friend Nanao's stepfather abusing her and killed the man with his bare hands to protect her. After being released from juvenile prison, he underwent the bugs procedure to follow after her.
He was 22 years old when he was sent to the second expedition and after seeing almost all his companions killed by the Terraformars including Nanao, he swore to one day return and enact his revenge. He indeed returns 20 years later as the Japanese leader of Annex I's squad 1. Komachi's powers are based on the Asian giant hornet, giving him enhanced strength and the ability to inflict lethal doses of poison with his stings. He is mortally wounded by Joseph during their fight, but he manages to kill him thanks to an overdose of the transformation drug keeping his body together.

The other survivor of the BUGS 2 expedition when he was 18, Hiruma swore to never return to Mars after what happened. Being the eldest of eleven siblings, he tried to betray the rest of the BUGS 2 crew along with one of his comrades, Victoria Wood, in order to gain more money by bringing a roach egg, but the egg hatched faster than expected and killed Victoria. He was saved by Shokichi and they fiercely fought the rest of the roaches. He eventually becomes the Prime Minister of Japan and works to enforce his country's position among the countries leading the Annex I mission. Hiruma's powers are based on the sleeping chironomid that just like its larva, bestows him with a seemingly invulnerable carapace along enhanced strength.

Shokichi's childhood friend and love interest who, after her stepfather was killed by Shokichi, joined the BUGS 2 crew. All she wanted was a peaceful life with Shokichi after returning to Earth, but tragically she was the first victim of the Terraformars when one of the roaches snapped her neck, dying in Shokichi's arms. Her powers were based on the silk moth, but died before being able to show them, until one of the Terraformars managed to copy her powers twenty years later.

The Captain of the BUGS 2 mission and Michelle's father. His powers were based on the Paraponera clavata, an ant so ferocious that even Army Ants will steer clear of its path, and is believed to be the world's strongest insect. He was capable of splitting in two the previously untouchable roaches with the pure strength of his arms or crush their heads with one hand. His power allowed him to fight off a horde of roaches singlehanded, giving time for his crew to escape. He was murdered by Victoria Wood. His daughter Michelle inherited his ant powers. Twenty years later, Michelle faces a roach that stole his powers.

Coming from Thailand, his powers were based on the desert locust and acquired an extreme leg strength that could decapitate a Terraformar with one kick. He sacrifices himself to allow Shokichi and Ichiro to use the BUGS 2 emergency escape pod to save themselves, after he overdosed on the drug and his body was more locust than human. He dies while being hugged by Komachi, calling him a friend. Twenty years later a cockroach is able to copy his powers.

The lieutenant of the BUGS 2 crew, her powers were based on a mantis, that gave her 2 mantis-like arms capable of cutting the roaches. She was killed by one of the evolved cockroaches. She was Liu Yiwu's childhood friend and was sent to as a spy to steal the technology on the BUGS surgery in America, only to be captured and underwent the BUGs surgery as part of her release negotiations by the Chinese government.

Coming from Israel, his powers were based on the bombardier beetle, and he was able to mix hydrogen peroxide and hydroquinone just like the bug itself. Combining these two substances, he could then release a spray of extremely hot benzoquinone from his palms, creating a huge explosion, not unlike a flame-thrower. He was the first person to die battling the cockroaches. Twenty years later a roach was able to copy his powers and uses them to kill Sheila.

Coming from Russia, her powers were based on the rainbow stag beetle. She was cut in half by one of the roaches swift kick, despite the natural strength of the beetle's shell. Her powers are then used by one of the cockroaches, twenty years later.

Coming from South Africa, her powers were based on the emerald cockroach wasp, and she was capable of enslaving cockroaches by stinging them in the brain and even hiding within their bodies. She tried to betray the rest of the crew alongside Ichiro by bringing a roach egg, but later she revealed her plan on taking over the world using her powers. Unexpectedly the egg hatched and the newly evolved roaches were immune to her poison. She died during the crash landing.

Annex I

A Japanese member of the Annex I expedition, he is the son of Nanao Akita  who performed the Bug Procedure, earning him some latent powers as well. After undergoing the procedure himself, Akari earned the powers of the Japanese bagworm moth allowing him to generate thin but incredibly strong and elastic strings that even the Terraformars are unable to see or break. In combat he combines his strings with martial arts, proving himself deadly even for the special terraformars. His personal battle weapon is a katana that can easily cut the Terraformars, much like George Smiles' sword, used in tandem with his adoptive family's sword arts. It is revealed that his innate powers come from the mantis, which grew a sharp mantis-like arm, and made his thread become sharp and filled with thorns. He and Michelle have a mutual attraction to one another, although their relationship has thus far remained one of subordinate and superior.

The American leader of the Annex I expedition, Michelle is the daughter of Donatello K. Davis, one of the victims of the BUGS 2 expedition and granddaughter of M. K. Davis, the executive responsible for the BUGS 1 mission. Like Akari, she is the child of a subject of the Bug Procedure, which gives Michelle the same powers her father had, that of the Paraponera. It gives her formidable strength and durability allowing her to sustain hits from the roaches and crush them easily. After receiving her M.O. Operation Michelle gained the powers of the blast ant, that give her the ability of exploding her enemies after a couple seconds like a bomb. While facing the Terraformar with her father's powers, she uses her personal battle weapons: six jet propellants (one for each elbow, one for each foot, and two in her back) that makes her incredibly fast and greatly enhances the impact of her blows. She and Akari have a mutual attraction to one another, although their relationship has thus far remained one of superior and subordinate.

A Mexican boy who joins the Annex I crew alongside his childhood friends Alex and Sheila in order to escape the poverty of his country and gain an American citizenship. His M.O. Operation powers come from the huntsman spider giving him great strength, ferocity and incredible speed that can bypass the roaches, leaving them no time to counterattack. Despite his immeasurable speed, his endurance is a bit low, forcing him to recharge after some time fighting, leaving him vulnerable to attack. In combat Marcos also uses a staff that he calls the "Arachnebuster Mk.II" that he uses to deflect ranged attacks and impale the roaches.

A Mexican boy who joins the Annex I crew alongside his childhood friends Marcos and Sheila in order to gain an American citizenship and become a professional baseball player. His M.O. Operation powers come from the harpy eagle, that allows him to fly and makes his eyesight eight times stronger than humans and his upper-body muscles incredibly strong. Thanks to his great gripping strength Alex is able to throw things so fast that their impact on the target is like a bullet, and thanks to his great eyesight he can throw things from impossible distances so that the enemy don't even see them coming.

A Mexican girl that along with her two childhood friends Marcos and Alex escaped from her country and joined the Annex I to have the American citizenship. She seems to have a crush on Shokichi. She is killed when, while trying to capture a roach, the insect unexpectedly uses the powers of one of the fallen BUGS 2 crew to shoot a hole through her chest. She dies while trying to confess her feelings for Shokichi, to which he apparently understood her.

A member of the Annex I crew that joined the mission in order to pay the debts of the treatment of his retinal detachment. A former lightweight boxing champion, his M.O. Operation powers come from the peacock mantis shrimp, making him incredibly strong and durable, capable of regenerate any lost limbs after a few minutes with little effort. In addition to their powerful blows, the mantis shrimp also possesses one of the most advanced eyes in the animal kingdom, enabling him to see clearly in pitch-darkness.

A member of the Annex I crew who joined the mission in order to pay and sever her connections with her disgraced family. Her M.O. Operation powers come from the white-throated needletail, which grants her lightweight skin of amylose and strong chest muscles enough to lift her body into the air. While flying, she is so fast that the terraformar cannot match her movements. She uses a special body kit weapon with blades that allows her to swiftly kill several terraformars.

A Japanese girl that joined the Annex Project because of her financial debts. Her M.O. Operation powers come from the striped skunk and is capable of producing a smell so strong even the Terraformars will stay away from her (for some time), but she lacks any offensive capabilities. When used in tandem with Akari, however, the chemicals that produce the smell can cause lethal damage to her opponents.

An American man that joined the Annex Project to pay his economical debts. His M.O. Operation powers come from the killer whale, which makes him able to use echolocation by sending out ultrasonic waves and through the reflection of these waves, he is able to accurately locate and identify enemies even if they are underground or not visible. He was shot in the throat by the Archer Fish Terraformar and then he sacrificed himself to protect the unconscious members of his team from the Echidna Terraformars.

The leader of the Russian squad. He chose to join the Annex Project to save his daughter from the deadly A.E. Virus that afflicts Earth. A very perceptive person, he's able to deduce others' base form powers simply by analyzing. He also has his own theories about the origin of the Terraformars' intelligence and adaptability, calling it "The memory left by Rahab". His M.O. Operation powers are those of the Tasmanian giant crab, that grants him incredible strength and durability, being able of taking heavy hits from the roaches without even being damaged and crush them easily. Moreover he is able to eventually regenerate any lost limbs after few minutes with little effort. He's also a samba and judo practitioner. He stays behind with Liu and Shoukichi while the other survivors escape.

A member of the Russian squad that joined the Annex crew alongside his sister Elena. Unlike the other members of the Russian team, Ivan is always cheerful and positive. After his sister is killed, he tries to act more serious towards his team, with varying results. His M.O. Operation powers come, surprisingly, from the plant Datura stramonium, and makes him able to cause fever, hallucinations, breathing dysfunction and even heart failure to his opponent when hit. He usually applies the wrong dosage of the poison, which ends killing the terraformars outright. In combat Ivan also uses grenades that release his own poison as a gas, poisoning all the targets who inhale the gas.

A member of the Russian team that joins the Annex project alongside her brother Ivan. Unlike her brother, she is always calm, serious and self-confident. While trying to capture a roach using a special net, the bug unexpectedly uses the super speed powers of one of the fallen members of the BUGS 2 crew to decapitate her.

A member of the Russian squad and Sylvester's son in-law, who joined the Annex Project in order to find the cure of the A.E. Virus and save his wife and unborn child. While laid-back, he's extremely loyal to his cause and his comrades. His M.O. Operation powers originate from the Sumatra stag beetle which, while unremarkable, allows him to burn his innards to create smoke and to easily cut the Terraformars. Despite being wounded, he launches a one-man assault against the Chinese Squad inside the Annex in order to kill Hong. He hesitates in killing the girl and is attacked by Jet, Xi and Dorjiberke. He overdoses on the drug and dies when Hong begs him not to kill Xi.

A member of the Russian team who joined the Annex Project alongside her husband, Aaron. Despite the love for her husband, Nina seems to have a mutual attraction towards Ivan Perepelkin. Her M.O. Operation powers come from the Deathstalker scorpion, which makes her able to grow two scorpion like tails, the first from her ponytail and the second from the tailbone, and produce a very dangerous poison. Aside from her M.O. powers, she's a regular practitioner of Sambo, a Russian self-defense martial art, and uses it efficiently in combination with her powers. She's killed by an Evolved Terraformar.

A member of the Russian team who joined the Annex Project alongside his wife Nina. His M.O. Operation powers originate from the Chinese red-headed centipede, that makes his skin (with the exception of his joints) both resilient and hard. He dies while protecting his wife from the Demon Dragonfly Terraformar, and his corpse is taken by the Terraformars.

A member of the Russian squad. His M.O. Operation powers come from the Japanese mountain mole, which means he's capable of digging tunnels very fast thanks to his great claws and strong arms. He's killed by Terraformars during the final battle to reach the evacuation ship.

A member of the Russian squad and an acquaintance of Nina Yujik. Her M.O. Operation powers come from the trapdoor spider, which means that alongside Sergei are the main tunnel diggers. She and Ivan are the only surviving members of the Russian squad that manage to return to Earth.

The leader of the Chinese squad. He betrays the rest of the Annex crew alongside his team under orders from his home country to kidnap Akari and Michelle, and allow his country to study them and find a way to recreate their natural born abilities in order to make China the earth's governing superpower. He and his team not only lied about their purpose, but even their backgrounds and base forms were false. His M.O. Operation powers come from the blue-ringed octopus, which makes him incredibly strong and durable, being able to recover from heavy hits thanks to some type of body regeneration, generate tentacles, and restrain strong opponents. He is also capable of generating a very strong poison from his tentacles and he's also very skilled in kempo. When his countrymen try to kill him and Joseph, he survives and sides with Komachi. He ultimately stays behind on Mars with Sylvester to help Shoukichi kill Joseph. He sacrifices his life by ripping out his own heart and using it to replace Shoukichi's destroyed heart in order to save his life.

A member of the Chinese team. Coming from Thailand, his M.O. Operation powers originate from the tiger pistol shrimp, which allows him to send "shock waves" at his enemies. He also possess a special suit with a full-body personal omnidirectional sonar, called "Yellow Prawn-Goby", that allows him to locate enemies in every direction even if he can't see them. He's also quite skilled in different south-Asian martial arts. He's defeated by Akari but allowed to live and he eventually reunites with the surviving members of his squad.

A member of the Chinese squad very skilled in swordsmanship and hand-to-hand combat. It is later revealed that his M.O. Operation powers come from the sea squirt, which means he was cloned many times, and his amoral personality meant neither he or his clones went insane, and each has a different, albeit very similar personality. One of the clones was killed by Joseph, three more were killed by Marcos, the ones that remained dormant inside the Annex were killed by infiltrated Terraformars, while the remaining ones remain with Liu Yiwu. The true original turned out to be with General Kai aboard the Kuzuryu warship. The original Bao is killed once and for all by Sylvester, who punches his head off.

A member of the Chinese squad. Her M.O. Operation powers come from the Pfeffer's flamboyant cuttlefish, making her able regrow missing limbs and to rapidly alter her skin color at will, making her practically invisible. She is also an expert martial artist. Despite trying to kill Keiji, after he protects Hong, they both agree to work together in order to kill the Ratel Terraformar, before both fall unconscious. She's eventually reunited with both Jet and Dorjiberke and board the Kuzuryu back to earth.

The youngest member of the Chinese Squad. Simple minded and emotive, her M.O. Operation powers come, incredibly, from a lethal bacteria. This makes her a living biological weapon capable of killing every terraformar and human within a certain radius if they do not have a protection suit. She looks up to Xi as an older sister. She and Chun-Li are captured by the other Squads and eventually she's allowed to return to earth alongside the other Chinese members.

A member of the Chinese squad from Mongolia with a keen sense of smell, who was almost forced to join the Annex Project. His M.O. Operation powers originate from the gray wolf and his skills are considered in par with the Insect Types. He's defeated (and possibly killed) by the combined efforts of Akari, Yaeko and Eva. Later it is shown he survived alongside Jet and eventually reunites with Hong and Xi.

The leader of the German squad. He has belonged to the U-NASA from a very young age, since he lost both his parents in a failed Bugs procedure and although he went to school, he was under a strict duty of confidentiality, in addition to the surveillance and health inspection. One day he met a girl and fell in love with her, marrying her and also having a son. After becoming an officer he trained his recruits, becoming a father-figure to them. He eventually found out his wife  was having an affair and that his son is most likely not related to him by blood. His M.O. Operation powers come from the electric eel, making his body stronger and more durable, and allowing him to generate incredibly powerful electric shocks from his muscles. Adolf also carries throwing knives that he uses to transmit his electric shocks, allowing them to kill a large group of roaches with a single attack.

A member of the German squad that befriends Akari, Michelle, Sheila, Marcos and Alex. A good hearted and naive girl, but also clumsy and very emotional, prone to collapsing when panicked, but capable of great courage in dire situations. Her family was very overprotective, controlling and hypochondriac, and after they lost their fortune, they sold her to the U-NASA that forced her to undergo the M.O. Operation. Her powers come from the planarian, and allowed her to fully regenerate from the explosion that killed Adolf and the rest of her squad. By absorbing Adolf's cells she now has his electric powers.

A Brazilian girl and member of the German Squad that acts as a big sister for Eva Frost and the other comrades in her squad. Her M.O. Operation powers belong to the Sia ferox, this grants her ferociousness and makes her legs incredibly strong, being able to move and jump very high easily. She's killed by one of the special Terraformars.

The leader of the Roma squad. Laid back and a flirt, he's considered the strongest person in the Annex I crew, being powerful enough to take on enough Terraformars and make a mountain-sized pile out of their bodies. He's the culmination of 600 years of selective breeding in humans, with a superior intellect and superhuman strength. His operation base's origin is never revealed, but it gives him the ability to regrow limbs and generate electricity. His weapon is the same sword used by George Smiles, a member of the BUGS 1 crew, 43 years before. He appears just in time to save Yaeko and Alex from a horde of terraformars, and defeats one of Bao's clones when the latter tries to use Michelle as a decoy. He proposes marriage to Michelle (much to her disbelief) before moving to face Liu Yiwu and the remaining clones. After killing one clone and incapacitating another, he and Liu move to fight one on one. He and Liu are nearly killed by the Chinese, but somehow survive and arrive to help Komachi. He eventually betrays the ANNEX 1 crew, revealing his purpose for being on the mission was to find a suitable mate, which Michelle had proven herself to be, but her and Akari's attraction to one another drove him over the edge, forcing him to remember the first time he had been rejected by a girl he loved, which was an act his ego couldn't allow. He faces Shōkichi in a one-on-one fight and ultimately loses when Shōkichi exploits Joseph's inability to comprehend love or emotional connections and is killed when Shōkichi uses the severed limb of the Praying Mantis roach to split him in half, decapitate him, and slice his head in two.
It is later revealed that he remained alive since he had taken Eva's planarian powers previously and his slowly regenerating body is returned to earth by members of his family, convinced that he has surpassed humanity. It is then revealed that they plan to use him as a figurehead once they take over the world. However, the defeat and the memory of Michelle's rejection have driven him insane.

A member of the American squad who aspires to become and engineer, hence the reason why he joined the Annex Project. His M.O. Operation powers come from the hammerhead shark, which gives him the ampullae of Lorenzini, allowing him to detect even the most minimal electric impulses.

A member of the American squad. Her M.O. Operation powers come from the echidna, being able to dig in the ground with her claws and to grow needles from her body to pierce her enemies. She was killed by the Demon Dragonfly Terraformar. Her powers were then stolen by the cockroaches.

A member of the American squad. Her M.O. Operation powers come from the Schlegel's Japanese gecko, which gives her toepads that allows her to adhere to most surfaces without the use of liquids or surface tension.

A member of the American Squad, whose M.O. Operation powers come from the narwhal, growing a horn in her forehead and also allows her to hold her breath for an incredibly long time. She has fallen in love with Keiji. During the infiltration of the Annex, she manages to remain conscious enough to send a message back to Earth, but is only capable of calling for help, incapable of informing about China's betrayal.

Twin brothers members of the American Squad. Their M.O. Operation powers come from the Ogre-faced spider, which allows them to shoot strings from his fingers. However they can shoot those threads only once, which is why they're ranked low. Ryuji is burned alive during the final run towards the evacuation ship, while Ryuichi manages to evacuate.

Others

The senior supervisor of U-NASA's BUGS 2 project. He is the one who came up with the idea of the Bugs Procedure as he knew that regular humans didn't stand a chance after his grandson, George Smiles (a member of the BUGS 1 crew) sent a cockroach head to Earth before dying. He observed the BUGS 2 mission from the internal cameras, and understood that the cockroaches learned to use their firearms. He later commented that the roaches have evolved so much on Mars and the humans didn't foresee it. Also that through BUGS 2 Mission, it became clear that the moss that their ancestors planted had been switched.

Ichiro's younger brother. He is the major of the Japan Air and Self Defence Force, and deputy commander of the U-NASA's Annex Project.

A professor from Tokyo Institute of Technology that supervised the BUGS 2 mission. He bribed Victoria and Ichiro in order to obtain a cockroach egg and turn it into a military power. After Victoria was killed and he tried to call her, Alexander answered instead; he had found out his plan and told him to just sit and watch as the crew battled the roaches. Twenty years later he went into hiding, until he was found and questioned by Shichisei, who told him all the advances that had taken place since the Bug Procedure. Then he and his research are used as leverage to guarantee Japan will keep the loyalty of the other countries involved with the Annex project, while keeping China in check.

The President of the USA in 2620 and an ally of Ichiro Hiruma.

The President of the Roma Federation in 2620. He chooses to remain loyal to Japan after Ichiro Hiruma casually mentions that he found professor Kou Honda. He claims that while Ichiro isn't a bright politician, he recognizes that Hiruma was smart enough to wait until his enemies showed themselves.

The Chancellor of Germany in 2620. She chooses to remain loyal to Japan after Ichiro Hiruma casually mentions that he found professor Kou Honda.

An orphan and Akari's childhood friend. She was one of the many infected by the A.E. Virus and needed a transplant in order to live longer, but died 2 days before Akari met Shokichi and Michelle.

A ten-year-old boy infected with the A.E. Virus that Akari befriends during his training at the U-NASA. Akari promises him to find a cure for his illness on the day he embarks to Mars, despite Michelle telling him not to give him much hope. He's currently hospitalized at the U-NASA.

Sylvester's daughter and Alexander's wife, who became infected with the A.E. Virus during her pregnancy. While at first rejected Alexander's advances, his perseverance made her fall in love with him. She's currently hospitalized in the U-NASA.

Adolf's wife, whom he met during his college days. She cheated on her husband a year before he embarked to Mars, having a child with another man. Despite that, Adolf still cared about her, as he was afraid of losing the only person that made him feel "human".

A scientist working for the German branch of the U-NASA. Her husband, Thomas Bellwood, was a crew member of the BUGS 1 mission. She's the one who told Adolf that his son wasn't his.

Ichiro and Shichisei's brother, who was sent to the German Branch of the U-NASA to discuss Akari's powers.

A Chinese general and captain of the Kuzuryu Warship sent by his country to capture Akari and Michelle. His M.O. Operation powers come from the Cordyceps fungus, which allows him to manipulate insect brains and make them a 'puppet' by shooting spores from the palm of his hands.

Terraformars
The main antagonists, who hold an innate hatred for all humans, are 2m tall Martian cockroaches with humanoid bodies similar to Homo erectus, evolved by a mysterious civilization, the Rahab, who also created humanity. Their internal anatomy is nearly identical to that of regular cockroaches, and can remain mobile even when decapitated as long as the Suboesophageal ganglion remains intact and there is an open passage to the lungs. They don't feel pain and retain the abilities of normal cockroaches, such as incredible speed, strength and resistance on a human scale, allowing them to easily defeat a normal human.

There are different types of Terraformars, having adapted quickly during the BUGS 2 mission; furthermore, the Annex I mission discovered some had incorporated dead BUGS 2 crewmember capabilities, somehow copying the Bugs Procedure. Their insect ancestry is revealed by small antenna, a pair of cerci above their posterior, and the elytra covering the wings. They are animalistic, adaptable, bent on survival, and individually intelligent to different degrees. While Terraformars don't initially appear to have social structure, the Evolved Terraformars display leadership, rallying their brothers into a capable fighting force and leading their race from their headquarters in the Martian pyramid, built by the Rahab. A love of fighting humans has caused the Evolved Terraformars to develop hot-blooded personalities who can't resist a one-on-one fight. A Terraformar leader eventually appears in the form of a roach with the appearance of a Buddhist priest who has somehow learned Kalaripayattu, but is ultimately killed by Alex in a last-ditch attack after he is badly wounded by it. A second priest-like Terraformar known as Invoker then takes its place, but this one has mannerisms more in line with a scientist than a warrior, preferring to kidnap and study humans rather than kill them.

Their intelligence is so high, they were able to rebuild the BUGS 1's old ship and fly it back to Earth, infiltrating homes in several countries; and, began learning human social knowledge through computers, cellphones and books taken from the humans killed on Earth; and, have stolen cars and clothing. They have a written motto: "WE ARE THE COSMOS". Under their new leadership, the Terraformars have revealed themselves to the public and now engage in open skirmishes with Annex 1's crew while they attempt to kidnap humans to experiment on. They eventually take up residence on a manmade Chinese island and, following a raid by the Annex 1 crew, reveal that the experiments that they are performing are all in service of Invoker's goal of restoring the Rahab civilization.

References

Terra Formars